Zatrephes trailii is a moth in the family Erebidae. It was described by Arthur Gardiner Butler in 1877. It is found in French Guiana, Venezuela and Brazil.

References

Phaegopterina
Moths described in 1877